Acacia intorta is a shrub or tree belonging to the genus Acacia and the subgenus Juliflorae that is endemic to arid parts of central Western Australia.

It has contorted main branches and tend to spread horizontally and has glabrous branchlets. The erect, evergreen phyllodes are straight and most often terete. It blooms from April to June producing yellow flowers.

It is native to an area in the Pilbara and Goldfields regions of Western Australia with the bulk of the population found between Meekatharra and Newman where it is found on stony ridges, shape slopes and saline drainage floors where it grows in calcrete and alkaline clay soils.

See also
List of Acacia species

References

intorta
Acacias of Western Australia
Plants described in 1983
Taxa named by Bruce Maslin